Damien Molony (born 21 February 1984) is an Irish actor. He is best known for his television roles as Hal Yorke in BBC Three's Being Human, DC Albert Flight in the BBC's Ripper Street, DS Jack Weston in Channel 5's Suspects, Jon in Channel 4's GameFace and Dylan in Sky One Original comedy Brassic.

Early life
Molony was born in Johnstownbridge on 21 February 1984. He studied at Clongowes Wood College in Clane, followed by Trinity College in Dublin, where he completed a degree in business and politics and became involved in the acting society. He soon moved to London to attend Drama Centre London.

Career

Early work (2007–2011) 
After graduating in 2011, Molony co-starred as Giovanni in a production of the John Ford play 'Tis Pity She's a Whore at the West Yorkshire Playhouse, directed by Jonathan Munby. He won the second prize in the 2011 Ian Charleson Awards for his performance.

Molony's casting as vampire Hal in the BBC Three series Being Human brought him his first television credit. In an interview with SFX magazine, Molony revealed that when approaching the role of Hal he did research on drug addicts and alcoholics. He has previously starred in the short film When the Hurlyburly's Done, filmed in Germany.

After the filming of series 4 of Being Human, in January 2012 Damien played the lead role of Motl Mendl in the National Theatre production of Travelling Light alongside Sir Antony Sher. Following a long run at the Lyttelton Theatre, the play toured England and was broadcast in cinemas worldwide with National Theatre Live. He returned to the National Theatre in January 2015 to play Spike in Sir Tom Stoppard's The Hard Problem, which ran until 17 May 2015 and also had a worldwide broadcast via NT Live, on 16 April 2015. Both plays were directed by the then Artistic Director of the National Theatre, Sir Nicholas Hytner.

Rising popularity (2012–present) 
The fifth and final series of Being Human was screened in February–March 2013. At the same time Molony starred in the play "If You Don't Let Us Dream, We Won't Let You Sleep" at the Royal Court Theatre.

Damien's television slate grew when in the same year he joined the cast of Victorian BBC show Ripper Street in series 2 as Detective Constable Albert Flight. He appeared in 7 of 8 episodes on BBC One in the UK and BBC America. The crime drama was set in London's Whitechapel in the period following the Jack the Ripper murders.

Molony returned to theatre, alongside William Gaminara in the play The Body of an American by Dan O'Brien in January–February 2014 at the Gate Theatre (London) about the conversation of a war photographer and a struggling playwright.

The actor then landed the role of Detective Sergeant Jack Weston in innovative crime procedural Suspects. The drama, shot in a documentary style using fly-on-the-wall filming techniques, premiered in the UK February 2014. The show ran for five series, the last airing August 2016, with a new cast line-up and a change in format and Molony taking centre stage in a six part story. All five series of the show have also reached American audiences via streaming service Acorn TV.

Molony was cast as Robert Putnam in an HBO pilot, The Devil You Know, created by Jenji Kohan and directed by Gus Van Sant in 2015, alongside Eddie Izzard and Karen Gillan. Set in 17th century New England and focusing on the Salem witch trials, the drama was filmed in Boston USA, but was not picked up by the network.

Damien's first role in a feature film was as the character Ross in Kill Your Friends, adapted from the novel by John Niven, set in the music industry in the Britpop era. The film's theatrical premiere via Altitude Films took place in the UK and Europe November 2015, followed by a US release with Well Go USA April 2016.

His second feature film Tiger Raid, shot in the deserts of Jordan, saw him star in a leading role alongside Brian Gleeson and Sofia Boutella. A dark thriller about a tiger kidnapping in Iraq, the film had its world premiere at Tribeca International Film festival April 2016, with a UK premiere at the Edinburgh International Film Festival in June and a UK DVD and VOD release 17 October 2016.

Appearing alongside Irish talent Aidan McArdle and Adam Fergus, Molony's next TV project was in RTÉ One crime drama Clean Break, which aired in Ireland September 2015.

He next starred alongside Phoebe Waller-Bridge in her first TV comedy Crashing as the character Anthony. The series premiered January 2016 on Channel 4 in the UK and later in the year internationally, via streaming platforms.

Damien also returned to the stage in 2016, appearing in No Man's Land alongside Ian McKellen, Patrick Stewart and Owen Teale. Directed by Sean Mathias, the production toured the UK from August, before a run a Wyndham's Theatre in London until 17 December, with a National Theatre Live broadcast to cinemas worldwide 15 December.

21 February 2017 Molony was announced as cast in comedy sitcom GameFace, written by Roisin Conaty who also stars as the lead character Marcella. He played Marcella's long-suffering driving instructor Jon. The six episode first series aired October to November 2017 on UK TV channel E4 and became available in the US, Australia and New Zealand shortly after via on demand platforms.

Molony appeared on stage with Sir Ian McKellen for a second time in 2017, playing Edmund in Chichester Festival Theatre production of King Lear for a short run from 22 September to 28 October.

He appeared as Bourke Cockran in his next feature film The Current War, directed by Alfonso Gomez-Rejon which world premiered at the Toronto International Film Festival on 9 September 2017. Originally set for a theatrical released on 24 November 2017, the film's cinema outing was delayed to July 2019 in the UK and October in the US, after sexual misconduct allegations were made against Harvey Weinstein, shortly followed by a DVD release.

Opening the new year in 2018, Molony starred opposite Jessie Buckley in two major BBC Radio 3 productions, adaptations of the plays 'Tis Pity She's a Whore by John Ford and The Effect by Lucy Prebble. He then played the title role in BBC Radio 4 Drama Judas, which aired every day in the week leading up to Easter. Written by Lucy Gannon, the drama told the story of disciple Judas Iscariot from his own perspective in the days leading up to the death of Jesus.

From 20 June 2018, Damien appeared in BBC Radio 4 World War 1 serial drama Home Front, playing the new character Hardy Walsh introduced in series 14, 'Needs Must When The Devil Drives'.

Damien made his first appearance in a web series in October 2018, guest starring in episode 1 of Right Now, Robert Cawsey's new online comedy based on Grindr hook-ups.

August 2018 Molony was announced as cast in new Sky One comedy TV series Brassic, co-created by Joe Gilgun and Danny Brocklehurst, starring alongside Michelle Keegan and Gilgun, as the character Dylan. Production on series 1 began in September 2018, filming completed in December, post-production completed 22 February 2019. The series premiered August 2019. A second series was announced on the same day.

A second series of GameFace was announced by Channel 4 June 2018, but Damien was only revealed as appearing in the new series when show writer Roisin Conaty published behind-the-scenes of him during filming, from March to April 2019. Series 2 aired 17 July 2019 Channel 4 in the UK and reached audiences in the US via Hulu shortly after.

In 2019, Molony also appeared in two short films with film festival premieres; Keep Breathing, a crowdfunded project written by and starring Emmeline Hartley, which is inspired by the Me Too movement and has a sexual consent theme and The Fabric Of You, an animated short, written and directed by Josephine Lohoar Self, world premiering at the 2019 Edinburgh International Film Festival. Both films had a wide release on Vimeo during 2021.

It was announced in July 2019 that Damien had joined the cast of BBC / Sister legal drama The Split for series 2. The series premiered 11 May 2020 on BBC One in the UK, with Molony in the role of new character Tyler Donaghue, shortly followed by a release in the United States on Sundance TV, 15 May 2020.

In 2020 Damien also appeared in Brassic series 2, which premiered on SKY in the UK in May. Ahead of the second series, Sky announced a third had also been commissioned, at their Up Next 2020 showcase event. Filming for series 3 began in October 2020 and took place during the pandemic, with a premiere date of 6 October in the UK. Series 4 has also been announced and is currently filming.

A third and final series of The Split was announced and began production in June 2021, with Damien confirmed to return as Tyler Donaghue.

It was announced in July 2021 that Damien would be appearing in the third series of Channel 4 drama anthology series On The Edge, in "gut-wrenching" horror Cradled.

In 2022, Molony appeared in the third series of Derry Girls on Channel 4.

Personal life
As of 2019, Molony resides in London and is married with a son.

Molony began regularly donating blood in 2012, after someone close to him needed blood during their cancer treatment. As part of National Blood Week in 2013, he was interviewed in the summer edition of Blood Donor Magazine and appeared on the front cover as his Being Human character Hal Yorke, with the headline "a blood addict giving blood". He has since raised awareness of the importance of blood donation and campaigned to motivate others via his Twitter page. After completing his 13th donation in February 2017, he encouraged others to consider donating in order to "save lives, burn calories, [and] feel really proud".

Filmography

Film

Television

Theatre

Audio

Awards and nominations

References

External links
 
 
 

1984 births
Living people
Alumni of the Drama Centre London
Irish male stage actors
Irish male television actors
Male actors from County Kildare